"Yesterday's Dreams" is a 1968 single recorded by The Four Tops for the Motown label. The song was written by Vernon Bullock, Jack Goga, Ivy Jo Hunter and Pam Sawyer.  The single was one of the first the group released after the departure of Holland-Dozier-Holland, who had handled the majority of the Four Tops recordings prior to 1968. Released from the album of the same name, the song only became a modest hit on the US chart, peaking at #31 on Billboard's Best Selling Soul Singles chart and #49 on the Hot 100. Outside of the US, "Yesterday's Dreams" reached #23 in the UK.

Billboard described the single as a "driving rhythm ballad aimed right at the top of the Hot 100," stating that it was one of the Four Tops' "most potent performances."  Cash Box said that the group is "grooving in a melancholy blues waltz tempo with a song that builds in volume and impact as the story of lost love develops."

References

Personnel
Lead vocal by Levi Stubbs
Background vocals by Abdul "Duke" Fakir, Renaldo "Obie" Benson, and Lawrence Payton
Additional background vocals by The Andantes
Instrumentation by The Funk Brothers

1968 singles
Four Tops songs
Songs written by Ivy Jo Hunter
Songs written by Pam Sawyer
Motown singles
1968 songs
Song recordings produced by Ivy Jo Hunter